K. P. B. Hinduja College of Commerce is a college in South Mumbai area of Charni Road, Mumbai, India. It was established in 1974 and has a student population of 6000 and 105 teachers. The college offers 25 courses from the higher secondary up to the doctorate level. It was founded by Parmanand Deepchand Hinduja, the founder of the Hinduja Group.

References

Universities and colleges in Mumbai
Affiliates of the University of Mumbai
Commerce colleges in India
Educational institutions established in 1974